Tommy Caldwell (born August 11, 1978) is an American rock climber who has set records in sport climbing, traditional climbing, and in big-wall climbing. Caldwell made the first free ascents of several major routes on El Capitan in Yosemite National Park.

He made the first ascents of some of the hardest sport climbing routes in the U.S., including Kryptonite with grade of 5.14c/d, and the world's first  route, Flex Luthor, at the Fortress of Solitude, Colorado in 2003. In January 2015, Caldwell and Kevin Jorgeson completed the first free climb of the Dawn Wall of El Capitan. At the time, their 19-day ascent was considered one of the hardest big wall free ascents in history.

In 2015, National Geographic called Caldwell "arguably the best all-around rock climber on the planet", and he is an important figure in the history of the sport.

Early life and education 
Caldwell grew up in Loveland, Colorado. His father is Mike Caldwell, a former teacher, professional body builder, mountain guide and rock climber, who introduced Tommy to rock climbing at a young age. His mother, Terry, was also a mountain guide. The family, including Tommy's sister, went on annual trips to Yosemite National Park where Tommy's love for the park and rock climbing flourished.

Taken hostage in Kyrgyzstan and Uzbekistan 
Caldwell and three fellow climbers Beth Rodden, John Dickey, and Jason 'Singer' Smith were held hostage for six days by rebels in Kyrgyzstan in August 2000. Caldwell pushed one of the kidnappers off a cliff, and subsequently escaped to government soldiers. They later learned that the man had survived the fall. A book about their ordeal, Over the Edge: The True Story of Four American Climbers' Kidnap and Escape in the Mountains of Central Asia was written by Greg Child. A follow-up article, "Back from the Edge", was published in Outside magazine the following year. Caldwell gave a filmed lecture "How Becoming a Hostage and Losing a Finger Made Him a Better Climber".

Loss of a finger 
Caldwell accidentally sawed off much of his left index finger with a table saw in 2001. Doctors were able to reattach the severed portion, but Caldwell decided he did not want the useless finger, which doctors said would never heal fully and he would never be able to use to climb with again, and the damaged part of the finger was later permanently removed.

Historic climbs 

He made the first ascents of some of the United States' hardest sport routes (as of 2008) including Kryptonite (5.14c/d) and Flex Luthor (5.15a/b) at the Fortress of Solitude, Colorado. The latter route remained unrepeated for 18 years, before finally being repeated by Matty Hong in October 2021, who suggested the grade 5.15b (9b) (later reversed). This would have made Flex Luthor the first confirmed 9b in the world, 5 years before Chris Sharma's ascent of Jumbo Love 5.15b (9b).

In May 2004, he completed the first free ascent (FFA) of Dihedral Wall. In 2005, he and Beth Rodden—swapping leads—made the third and fourth free ascents of The Nose. Two days later, on October 16, Caldwell free-climbed The Nose in less than 12 hours. A few days later, Caldwell climbed The Nose in 11 hours, descended the East Ledges, and then climbed Freerider, topping out 12 hours later – the first ascent of two El Capitan free climbs in 24 hours. On El Capitan, Caldwell has also free-climbed: Lurking Fear, Muir Wall, West Buttress, Salathé, Zodiac, Magic Mushroom, The Dawn Wall, and New Dawn.

In January 2015, Caldwell and Kevin Jorgeson completed the first free climb of the Dawn Wall of El Capitan in Yosemite National Park, after six years of planning and preparation.
Their 19-day ascent of the Dawn Wall was considered by some as the hardest successful rock climb in history.
The following year Czech climber Adam Ondra free climbed the Dawn Wall in 8 days. Ondra praised Caldwell and Jorgeson saying, "Tommy and Kevin put so much effort into the climb and faced so many question marks and logistical problems that I cannot really compare my effort to theirs. I had it prepared, had all the knowledge. I knew it was possible".

Documentaries

Progression 
Caldwell was one of the climbers featured in the 2009 film Progression. The film discussed his quest to climb the Dawn Wall, and it was after seeing the film that Jorgeson contacted Caldwell to join him in the effort.

The Dawn Wall 
The Dawn Wall, a documentary following Caldwell and Jorgeson on their free climb of the Dawn Wall, was released on September 19, 2018. The documentary was directed by Josh Lowell and Peter Mortimer.

Free Solo 
Caldwell appeared in the documentary Free Solo, released on September 28, 2018, about Alex Honnold's free solo ascent up El Capitan in Yosemite National Park. In the documentary, Caldwell is seen working with Honnold to prepare for the climb, and is interviewed about Honnold and rock climbing.

Notable ascents 

 2001: The Honeymoon is Over V 5.13 Longs Peak, Colorado. FA with Beth Rodden belaying.
 2003: Flex Luthor (5.15a/b), Fortress of Solitude, Colorado
 2003: West Buttress  (FFA) VI 5.13c, El Capitan, Yosemite Valley, California
 2004: Dihedral Wall (FFA) VI 5.14a, El Capitan, Yosemite Valley, California
 2005: The Nose VI 5.13, 3rd/4th Free Ascent (with Beth Rodden), El Capitan, Yosemite Valley, California
 2006: Linea di Eleganza VI 5.11b A3 90 degrees M7 Fitz Roy, Argentine Patagonia.  FFA with Topher Donahue and Erik Roed.
 2008: Magic Mushroom (FFA) VI 5.14a with Justen Sjong, May 12–17, 2008, El Capitan, Yosemite, California
 2012: Yosemite Triple Crown 5.13a, 1st All Free Ascent with Alex Honnold
 2013: Dunn-Westbay 5.14a, 1st Free Ascent with Joe Mills, Longs Peak, Colorado 
 2014: Fitz Traverse VI 5.11d C1 65 degrees, First Ascent with Alex Honnold
 2015: Dawn Wall (FFA) 5.14d with Kevin Jorgeson, December 27, 2014 – January 14, 2015, El Capitan, Yosemite, California
2018: The Nose 5.9 C2, Sub- 2-hour record with Alex Honnold, El Capitan, Yosemite Valley, California

Personal life
Caldwell and Beth Rodden married in 2003, and subsequently divorced in 2010. In 2010 he met photographer Rebecca Pietsch. They married in 2012. The couple have a son, Fitz, and a daughter, Ingrid Wilde, and live in Estes Park, Colorado.

Publications

See also 
History of rock climbing
List of first ascents (sport climbing)
 Alex Honnold
 Brad Gobright

Footnotes

External links 
 
 

1978 births
American rock climbers
Living people
People from Estes Park, Colorado
Piolet d'Or winners